Brian Reynolds Myers (born 1963), usually cited as B. R. Myers, is an American professor of international studies at Dongseo University in Busan, South Korea, best known for his writings on North Korean propaganda. He is a contributing editor for The Atlantic and an opinion columnist for The New York Times and The Wall Street Journal. Myers is the author of Han Sǒrya and North Korean Literature (Cornell, 1994), A Reader's Manifesto (Melville House, 2002), The Cleanest Race (Melville House, 2010), and North Korea's Juche Myth (Sthele Press, 2015).

Early life and education
Myers was born in New Jersey, near Fort Dix. His mother is British, and his father was a U.S. Army officer from Pennsylvania who served in South Korea as a military chaplain, often helping out local orphans. Myers is also a descendant of John F. Reynolds though his father.

Myers spent his childhood in Bermuda and his high school youth in apartheid-era South Africa, and received graduate education in West Berlin during the early 1980s, occasionally visiting East Germany. He earned an MA degree in Soviet studies at Ruhr University (1989) and a PhD degree in Korean studies with a focus on North Korean literature at the University of Tübingen (1992). Myers subsequently taught German in Japan and worked for a Mercedes-Benz liaison office in Beijing during the mid-1990s.

Career
Before his appointment at Dongseo University, Myers lectured in North Korean literature and society at the Korea University's North Korean Studies Department. He also taught globalization and North Korean literature at the Inje University Korean Studies Department.

Journalism

Opinion columns
Myers’ opinion columns for the Atlantic, The New York Times, and The Wall Street Journal generally focus on North Korea, which he says is not a Marxist-Leninist or a Stalinist state, but a "national-socialist country." He has also commented in The New York Times on the common view of the ROKS Cheonan sinking in South Korea with regard to its perception of North Korea. He stated that there was a lack of outrage over the incident among South Koreans due to the racialized nature of Korean nationalism; in other words, there was no major uproar over the incident in South Korea because of the concept of racial solidarity with the North Koreans that many South Koreans feel, which Myers said overruled patriotism towards South Korea in many cases. Myers stated that inter-Korean racial solidarity manifests itself by South Koreans supporting the North Korean soccer team at the FIFA World Cup and such. He contrasted the racialized nature of South Korean nationalism with the civic nature of U.S. nationalism, stating that South Korea's antipathy over attacks by North Korea was potentially dangerous to the national security of the South Korean state:

Book reviews
His book reviews have included denunciations of American historian Bruce Cumings (who he says is an admirer of the North Korean regime), American author Toni Morrison, American author Denis Johnson, South Korean novelist Hwang Sok-yong, and American author Jonathan Franzen.

Books

Myers' Han Sŏrya and the North Korean literature: The Failure of Socialist Realism in the DPRK (1994) was adapted from his 1992 dissertation at the University of Tübingen and published as the sixty-ninth volume of the Cornell East Asia Series.

A Reader’s Manifesto: An Attack on the Growing Pretentiousness in American Literary Prose (2002) was developed from his critical review essay of the same name published in the Atlantic in 2001.

The Cleanest Race: How North Koreans See Themselves and Why It Matters (2010) is a discussion of North Korean propaganda, contending that North Korea under Kim Jong-il was guided by a "paranoid, race-based nationalism with roots in Japanese fascism." Myers asserts that the North Korean political system is not based on communism or Stalinism, and he contends that the official Juche idea is a sham ideology for foreign consumption and intended to establish Kim Il-sung's credentials as a thinker alongside Mao Zedong. Myers also claims that post-Cold War attempts to understand North Korea as a Confucian patriarchy, based on the filial piety of Kim Jong-il and the dynastic transfer of power from his father, are misguided and that the North Korean leadership is maternalist rather than paternalist.

Myers furthers his argument about the status of Juche as a non-ideology in his book North Korea's Juche Myth (2015). According to his own account, promoting him to write the book was the realization he was making "not the slightest bit of headway" with The Cleanest Race in challenging the conventional wisdom about Juche in the academia. North Korea's Juche Myth develops a three-pronged categorization of North Korean propaganda. Some works are in the "inner track", meant for North Korean eyes only. Others are in the "outer track", meant primarily for North Korean consumption but mindful of the fact that foreigners can access them too. "Export track" propaganda specifically targets foreigners.

Reception and criticism
Myers’ book The Cleanest Race has been challenged by several academic critics. Charles K. Armstrong, then of Columbia University, suggested that the book "gives an intellectual gloss to attitudes many in the West already have about the DPRK". Felix Abt, a Swiss business affairs specialist who lived in North Korea for seven years, describes Myers' claims in The Cleanest Race as "flawed" and "shaky". Abt wrote that it was "rather absurd" to describe Juche as "window-dressing" for foreigners.

South Korean literary critic Yearn Hong Choi also regards the thesis of Myers' Han Sǒrya and North Korean Literature as erroneous:

Tatiana Gabroussenko points out that Myers is the only Western academic who thinks that North Korean literature does not have the hallmarks of socialist realism.

Scholar Andrei Lankov favorably reviewed The Cleanest Race as taking a "fresh approach" on North Korea. Lankov also says Myers' work is "informative" but is not sure whether his thesis has any relation to reality.

Personal life and politics
Myers is married to a South Korean woman, Myung-hee Myers. He lives and teaches in South Korea, where he moved to in September 2001. During the late 1990s, he lived in Valencia County, New Mexico. Politically, Myers is a supporter of the Green Party of the United States and animal rights. Myers can speak Korean, Mandarin, Japanese, and German. He is a vegan.

Bibliography

See also
 Propaganda in North Korea

References

Further reading

External links

B.R. Myers Dongseo University Faculty Page
Recent articles by B. R. Myers The Atlantic
Citation of Myers' work in The Week

1963 births
Academic staff of Dongseo University
American people of British descent
Koreanists
Living people
People from New Jersey
Ruhr University Bochum alumni
The New York Times people
The Wall Street Journal people
The Atlantic (magazine) people
University of Tübingen alumni
American expatriates in South Africa
American expatriates in Germany
American expatriates in South Korea
Academic staff of Korea University
Academic staff of Inje University
American expatriate academics